Fra’ Galgario (4 March 1655 – December 1743), born Giuseppe Vittore Ghislandi, and also called Fra’ Vittore del Galgario, was an Italian painter, mainly active in Bergamo as a portraitist during the Rococo or late-Baroque period.

Biography
He was born in Bergamo to an artist father, Domenico Ghislandi. Initially he entered the studio of Giacomo Cotta, then Bartolomeo Bianchi, and finally the studio of Sebastiano Bombelli in Venice of the 1690s. He also reported trained with the German portrait artist Salomon Adler in Milan.

In 1702, he entered the religious life in the Order of the Minims of the Monastery of Galgario, in Bergamo. He assumed the name of the saint for whom the monastery is named. He was elected a member of the Milanese Accademia Clementina in 1717.

He is said to blend the attention to colorism and glamour that captivates Renaissance-Baroque portraiture of Venice, with the realism of Milanese art such as that of Moroni. Among his pupils were Paolo Bonomino, Cesare Femi, and Pietro Gualdi (18th century painter).

Works
 Giovane con bicchiere di vino e natura morta con pane e cipolla
 Giovane con turbante
 Ragazzo col cappello piumato (L’Allegrezza)

Portraits
Count Giovanni Battista Vailetti
Accademia Carrara, Bergamo
Portrait of Francesco Maria Bruntino
Portrait of Advocate Giacomo Battamni de'Bazni
Portrait of G. Secco Suardo
Portrait of Count Galeatius Secco Suardo (1681-1733)
Portrait of the Gentleman of Finardi's House (1710)
Gentlewoman (around 1710)
Luigi Koelliker collection:
Portrait of Gian Domenico Tassi (between 1710–15)
Portrait of Clara Benaglio Finardi (1710), private collection
Giovanni Secco Suardo and Servant (1711) Giovanni Secco Suardo
Gentleman
Portrait of Count Giovan Battista Vailetti (1720), Galleria dell'Accademia, Venice
Portrait of a Young Girl, National Museum of Fine Arts, Algiers
Portrait of Count Andra Asperti With His Son
Portrait of Count Bartolomeo Secco Suardo in Arms
Portrait of Count Filippo Marenzi
Portrait of Count Gerolamo Secco Suardo
Portrait of Count Giovan Battista Vailetti
Portrait of Dottor Bernardi
Portrait of Marquess Giuseppe Maria Rota and Captain Antonio Brinzago da Lodi
Portrait of Marshal Matthias von der Schulenburg
Portrait of Sculptor Andrea Fantoni
Portrait of the Advocate Giacomo Bettami de' Bazini
Portrait of Bartolomeo Manganoni
Portrait of Bertrama Daina de' Valsecchi
Portrait of Carlo Tinti
Portrait of Domenico Ghislandi
Portrait of Elizabeth Piavana Ghidotti
Portrait of Young Sculptor, University of Arizona Art Museum, Tucson

Busts
Bust of Vitellio Imperatore
Bust of a Poet Laureate

References

short bio

External links

Painters of reality: the legacy of Leonardo and Caravaggio in Lombardy, an exhibition catalog from The Metropolitan Museum of Art (fully available online as PDF), which contains material on Galgario (see index)

1655 births
1743 deaths
Italian portrait painters
17th-century Italian painters
Italian male painters
18th-century Italian painters
Painters from Bergamo
Italian Baroque painters
Minims (religious order)
18th-century Italian male artists